James Earl Wooten (born September 20, 1941) is an American politician who has been serving as a member of the Arkansas House of Representatives from District 45 since 2019. He is a member of the Republican Party. He currently resides in Beebe, Arkansas with his wife, Renee. He is a member of the Baptist faith.

Biography 
Wooten was born on September 20, 1941, in North Little Rock, Arkansas, to Julian Simmons Wooten (1916-1958) and Hazel Marie Lindsey (1914-1994). Julian passed away when Wooten was 17 due to a coronary occlusion.

References 

Living people
1941 births
Politicians from North Little Rock, Arkansas
Republican Party members of the Arkansas House of Representatives
21st-century American politicians
People from Beebe, Arkansas